State Route 378 (SR 378) is a , four-lane divided highway that travels west-to-east entirely within Gwinnett County in the north-central part of the U.S. state of Georgia. The road is designated as a state highway. The route is heavily commercialized with numerous office and industrial parks. It is known along its entire length as Beaver Ruin Road. The roadway was built in the mid-1960s and designated a decade later.

Route description

SR 378 begins at an intersection with US 23/SR 13 (Buford Highway) in Norcross. It travels to the southeast, and curves to the northeast. Then, after it curves back to the southeast, it has an interchange with Interstate 85 (I-85). It continues to the southeast and meets its eastern terminus, an intersection with US 29/SR 8 (Lawrenceville Highway) in Lilburn.

SR 378 is not part of the National Highway System, a system of roadways important to the nation's economy, defense, and mobility.

History
The road that would eventually be designated as SR 378 was built along its current alignment between 1963 and 1966. By 1976, the entire road was designated as SR 378.

Major intersections

See also

References

External links
 

 Georgia Roads (Routes 361 - 380)

378
Transportation in Gwinnett County, Georgia